Naziha Jawdet Ashgah al-Dulaimi (1923 – 9 October 2007) was an early pioneer of the Iraqi feminist movement. She was a co-founder and the first president of the Iraqi Women League, the first woman minister in Iraq's modern history, and the first woman cabinet minister in the Arab world.

Early life
Al-Dulaimi was born in Baghdad, where her family had settled in the late 19th century. 

She studied medicine at the Royal College of Medicine (later attached to the University of Baghdad), where she was one of the few female students at the Medical College. During that time, she joined the "Women's Society for Combating Fascism and Nazism" and was actively involved in its work. Later on, when the society changed its name to the "Association of Iraqi Women," she became a member of its executive committee.

Career

Medicine (1941—1948) 
In 1941, she graduated as a medical doctor. After graduating, she joined the Royal Hospital in Baghdad, and later transferred to Karkh Hospital. Throughout that period, she was harassed by the monarchic security apparatus because she sympathized with the poor and cared for them free of charge at her clinic in the Shawakah district. Moving to Sulaimaniyah, her clinic once again turned into a refuge for impoverished patients who received her care for free. From Sulaiminiyah, she was transferred to other cities and provinces (Kerbala, Umarah).

Activism (1948—1958) 
In 1948, she became a full member of the Iraqi Communist Party (ICP), which at the time, was opposing the ruling monarchy. In January 1948, Dr. Naziha was involved in the popular uprising "al-Wathbah" against the colonialist Portsmouth Treaty.

In 1952, she wrote the book The Iraqi Woman. It was about women from the peasant class (al-fallahin) who were deprived of all rights, both in terms of gender oppression and class oppression. She also wrote about women from higher classes who had higher material status but were considered as property and not as human.

She attempted to revive the Association of Iraqi Women, supported by dozens of women activists, and applied to the authorities to set up a "Women's Liberation Society". The application was rejected. In response, some of the signatories led by Dr. Naziha decided to go ahead and set up this organization anyway, though clandestinely, after changing its name to the League for Defending Iraqi Woman's Rights. The League thus came into being on March 10, 1952. Among the League's objectives were: Struggling for national liberation and world peace. defending Iraqi women's rights, and protecting Iraqi children.

Politics (1958—1963) 
Under the leadership and active participation of Dr. Naziha, the League (now entitled Iraqi Women's League) developed during the following years and turned into a mass organization after the 14 July 1958 Revolution. With its membership rising to 42,000 (out of a total population at the time of 8 million citizens), it achieved many gains for Iraqi women, in particular the progressive Personal Status Law No. 188 (1959).

In appreciation of its role and achievements, the Iraqi Women's League became a permanent member of the Secretariat of the International Women's Federation. Dr. Naziha was elected to the Federation's assembly and executive. Later, she became vice president of this international organization. She became a prominent woman figure on an international level, as well as in the Arab world and "Third World."

During the 1950s, Dr. Naziha was an active participant in the Iraqi Peace Movement and was a member of the preparatory committee for the Peace Partisans conference that was held in Baghdad on 25 July 1954. She was also a member of the World Peace Council. She spent the 1950s researching and eradicating the indigenous Bejel bacteria in southern Iraq.

After the monarchy was overthrown, she was appointed by President Abd al-Karim Qasim as Minister of Municipalities in the 1959 cabinet as the sole representative of the ICP in his republican government. She was the first female minister in Iraq's modern history and the first woman cabinet minister in the Arab world. She later assumed the post of State Minister in a later cabinet formation. During her government career, al-Dulaimi was instrumental in turning the vast slums of eastern Baghdad into a massive public work and housing project that came to be known as Thawra City—now Sadr City. She also helped author the secular 1959 Civil Affairs Law, which reformed marriage and inheritance laws to the advantage of Iraqi women.

Exile and work abroad (1963—2002) 

Because of her activities in the Communist Party and the patriotic movement, Dr. Naziha was a victim of harassment and repression. She was forced to leave the country and go into exile several times. This did not stop her from helping the Communist party, the women's movement, and democratic rights. Dr. Naziha occupied a leading position in the party and became a member of its Central Committee. In the late 1970s, when the ruling dictatorial clique was preparing to launch its campaign against the Iraqi Communist Party, she was a member of the Secretariat of the Central Committee.

She played a prominent role in the leadership of the Committee for the Defense of the Iraqi People, which was set up after the leftist coup on February 8, 1963. The committee was headed by the Iraqi poet Muhammad Mahdi Al-Jawahiri. During the 1990s, she continued with her work in the women's movement, particularly in the Iraqi Women's League. The last major event she was actively involved with was a seminar on the situation of Iraqi women, held in 1999 in Cologne, Germany.

Later life and death 
Al-Dulaimi participated in preparations for the 5th Congress of the Iraqi Women's League. Before it was convened (in March 2002), she suffered a stroke, resulting in paralysis. She died on 9 October 2007 in Herdecke at the age of 84 from complications associated with her stroke.

References

External links
بيان رابطة المرأة العراقية بمناسبة الثامن من آذار عيد المرأة العالمي

1923 births
2007 deaths
Iraqi feminists
Government ministers of Iraq
Iraqi Communist Party politicians
Women government ministers of Iraq
20th-century Iraqi women politicians
20th-century Iraqi politicians